Angela Kristine Miller (born February 17, 1994), also known by her stage name Zealyn, is an American singer-songwriter. She came in third place on the twelfth season of American Idol in 2013. Her debut EP, Weathered, was released independently on November 12, 2014. Miller rebranded in 2016, opting for the stage name Zealyn. Since then, she has released a second, Limbic System, and third EP, A Weekend in Maine.

Early life
Angela Kristine Miller was born on February 17, 1994, in Beverly, Massachusetts, a suburb of Boston. Her father, Guy, and mother, Tana, graduated from Valley Forge Christian College in Phoenixville, Pennsylvania. The couple relocated to Massachusetts after Guy attended Gordon-Conwell Theological Seminary in South Hamilton to prepare for ordination as a Christian minister. The Millers served at churches in Lynnfield and on Cape Cod, where they resided for eight years, before becoming co-pastors at Remix Church, a member of the Assemblies of God protestant denomination, in Salem. Miller also has a brother, Jonathan. He is two years older than she. He is an integrant of hardcore band, Exiting the Fall.

At an early age, doctors diagnosed that the singer experienced 40-percent hearing loss in her left ear and 20-percent in her right, after discovering that the protective envelope of her eardrums had vanished. Consequently, she had ear tubes placed and, a month prior to her American Idol audition, fits for silicon spray ear plugs. Miller's condition has affected her singing, obstructing her hearing of her surroundings, rather than herself. She claimed that she learned to manage it a couple of years prior to her American Idol audition. In January 2013, her mother revealed to The Salem News that a third surgery to skin graft her eardrum was impending once Miller completed her stint on the series.

As a child, she was introduced to worship music at church and various other styles at home. The Millers are a musical family: Guy plays the keyboard, Tana plays the guitar, and Jonathan plays multiple instruments. Through watching them perform, Miller developed an interest for singing and songwriting at an early age, penning her first effort "Little Sparkle Dress" at age six. Her engagement in children's theatre further nourished her desire to perform. At the age of nine, Miller became an avid fan of the singing competition television series American Idol after seeing the second season finale, which made her long to someday enter the competition herself. She initially began playing guitar, but switched over to piano after receiving lessons from an instructor in Cape Cod. Though never receiving formal vocal training, she refined her singing with critiques from her mother and brother. Miller attended Beverly High School from 2008 to 2012, involving herself in the school's choir, honors vocal ensemble, and theatre program. She appeared in installments of The Will Rogers Follies, My Fair Lady, and Thoroughly Modern Millie. She was an active participant at her father's church as well, leading music during services. During high school, she also held a job at a fast-food restaurant at Northshore Mall in Peabody, and ran a popular YouTube account where she posted videos of herself covering modern hits. In 2011, Miller placed seventh out of over 1,000 contenders in the female solo category at the Assemblies of God National Fine Arts Festival in Phoenix, Arizona. She received scholarship offers from three Christian universities, including her top choice, Southwestern Assemblies of God University in Waxahachie, Texas. Miller did not accept any of the colleges' offers, and instead decided to audition for American Idol upon completing her high school studies.

Music career

2012–13: American Idol 

Miller auditioned for the twelfth season of American Idol in September 2012 at the Prudential Center in Newark, New Jersey, where she received a golden ticket and advanced to the next stage in Hollywood. During the season's final Hollywood rounds, Miller opted to perform the self-penned tune "You Set Me Free" on the piano, and was praised from the judges. At first introduced as Angela, she later adopted the moniker, "Angie", with which judge Keith Urban referred to her. Miller proceeded to perform without her piano, albeit of the judges' suggestions; she permanently retreated to the piano during the Top 7 episode. During the course of the series, Miller tackled songs by Jessie J, Beyoncé, Colton Dixon and others, dominated social media relative to her peers, and was called out for her resemblance to singer Miley Cyrus.

Miller was considered a fan favorite, often placing in the voting's top ranks and becoming the season's sole contestant to not land in the bottom 2 or 3 until her elimination in the Top 3. The elimination was described by journalists as "shocking" and "surprising," to which they attributed competitor Kree Harrison's victory to support from Vote for the Worst, voting from Middle America, and pity votes prompted by her homecoming video. Conversely, Kevin Rutherford of Billboard said the singer's elimination was caused by her inability match the accolades of her "You Set Me Free" performance. Others ascribed her choice to perform Elton John's "Sorry Seems to Be the Hardest Word" without playing the song on the piano. For her final performance, Miller reprised her version Dixon's "Never Gone" in tears, at times unable to sing, and later approached by her family onstage. Following the elimination, she expressed shock at the results, but claimed both finalists deserved the position in the finale.

Performances and results

 Due to the surprise non-elimination, the Top 4 remained intact for another week.

2013–2015: Weathered 

After her elimination from American Idol, Miller announced plans to launch a music career as soon as possible, as well as an eventual acting career. Of her intents for her debut studio album, Miller revealed that she wanted to write or co-write all material. She also intended to show all sides to her personality in an intricate and artistic manner which she feels current mainstream music largely lacks. She further explained,The top three finalists – Miller, Candice Glover and Harrison – recorded background vocals on a song for judge Mariah Carey's fourteenth studio album, though it is yet to be confirmed whether it will be on the final track listing. On May 17, 2013, subsequent to the series' finale, Miller released her debut single "You Set Me Free" to digital retailers via her American Idol contract with 19 Recordings. On May 22, 2013, reports surfaced that Miller had signed a publishing contract with Universal Music Publishing Group (UMPG), and is in midst of searching for a record deal. In June 2013, Miller confirmed she was co-writing with Toby Gad, Autumn Rowe, David Hodges, Adam Watts and his Red Decibel team and recording demos in Los Angeles, California, through social media. Along with the remainder of the Top 11 from season twelve, Miller embarked on the American Idols LIVE! Tour 2013, where she showcased original music, from July to August 2013. Later that year she also joined Jessie J at a concert of her Nice to Meet You Tour in the United Kingdom.

On December 3, 2013, Miller released a Christmas single, called "This Christmas Song" and a cover of "O Holy Night." In April 2014, Miller embarked on the "Angie in Asia" tour in Thailand, Vietnam and Indonesia.

A PledgeMusic campaign for her debut EP, Weathered, was launched on August 28, 2014 and was released on November 12, 2014. On October 13, 2014, Miller premiered a song from the EP, "Lost in the Sound," and a second song, "Miles" was premiered by Billboard on October 29, 2014. On November 20, 2014, Weathered debuted at number one on the Billboard Top Heatseekers chart and at number 131 on the Billboard 200 chart. In 2015, she released her first music video, for the song "Simple", the only single from the EP. In September 2015, she traveled to Kolkata, India to perform several small concerts around the city.

2016–present: Limbic System and A Weekend in Maine 
In February 2016, Miller announced that her new music, which she had begun writing in early 2015, would be released under the pseudonym Zealyn. According to Miller, the name Zealyn originated from the country New Zealand, with a friend recommending her to make it into a girl's name. On February 20, 2016, her song "Tides To The Moon" was featured in a trailer for "Little Mermaid."

She debuted her first single, "Talk:Listen" for streaming on February 26, 2016; it was released on March 4, 2016, for digital download. A second song, "Sleep On It",  premiered via Nylon magazine's official website. The song was available for digital download on April 1, 2016. Her alternative rock and electropop EP, Limbic System, was released on June 24, 2016, containing seven songs. "Limbic System" was recorded in two months during July and August 2015 at singer Aaron Marsh's studio in Lakeland, Florida. She co-wrote the songs for the album. The album's title song, "Limbic System" featuring JMR, was released for streaming on April 29, 2016. "Overwhelmed" featuring Aaron Marsh was released for streaming on May 25, 2016. The remix EP, Limbic System: Reimagined, was released on June 9, 2017, and features music remixed by Jon Santana, Sleeping Lion, The Lulls in Traffic, Stephen Laurenson, and Austin Cannon.

On May 17, 2019, her third EP, A Weekend in Maine, was released.

Personal life 
Miller moved to Los Angeles, California, in early 2014 to continue pursuing a professional music career. She and her longtime boyfriend, David James Williams, became engaged in late November 2015. They married in a small ceremony in Massachusetts on July 7, 2016.

Discography

As Angie Miller

Extended plays

Singles

Music videos

Releases from American Idol
 "I Surrender"
 "Yesterday"
 "Shop Around"
 "Bring Me to Life"
 "Anyone Who Had a Heart"
 "Love Came Down"
 "I'll Stand by You"
 "Halo"
 "Who You Are"
 "Cry Me a River"
 "Diamonds"
 "Someone to Watch Over Me"
 "Try"

As Zealyn

Extended plays

Remix albums

Singles

Music videos

Tours
2013: American Idols LIVE! Tour 2013
2013: Nice to Meet You Tour (Guest Star)
2013: Celebrate Christmas Tour
2014: Fox International: Angie In Asia
2015: Mini-tour in India
2017: Limbic System Parts 1 & 2

References

External links

 
 PR Agency Profile
 Angie Miller  on American Idol
 

1994 births
American Idol participants
American child singers
Living people
Deaf musicians
Assemblies of God people
American Pentecostals
People from Beverly, Massachusetts
People from Salem, Massachusetts
Singers from Massachusetts
American YouTubers
American deaf people
21st-century American women singers
21st-century American women pianists
21st-century American pianists
Music YouTubers
Beverly High School alumni
21st-century American singers